Salem, Wisconsin may refer to:
Salem (community), Kenosha County, Wisconsin, an unincorporated community
Salem, Pierce County, Wisconsin, a town in Pierce County
Salem (community), Pierce County, Wisconsin, an unincorporated community in Pierce County

See also
Salem Lakes, Wisconsin, a village in Kenosha County, formerly the town of Salem
Salem Oaks, Wisconsin, an unincorporated community in Kenosha County